San Justo de la Dóriga is one of 28 parishes (administrative divisions) in Salas, a municipality within the province and autonomous community of Asturias, in northern Spain.

Villages
 Cotariello (Cotariellu) 
 San Justo (San Xusto)

References

Parishes in Salas